Veronica St. Clair (born 6 April 1994) is an American actress. She is best known for playing the role Riley Velez on the NBC drama La Brea.

Early life 
Born to a Cuban mother and Filipino-American father, St. Clair grew up in Burbank, California. She attended John Burroughs High School, graduating in 2012.  She then attended the University of San Diego, where she pursued a Theatre and English degree and graduated cum laude in 2016.

Career 
St. Clair began her professional acting career with the La Jolla Playhouse in 2015. She starred in 'The Car Plays,' a series of intimate ten-minute plays, each taking place in a car.  She reprised her role in the Off Center Festival at the Segerstrom Center for the Arts in 2018. 

In addition, St. Clair has guest starred in the Golden Globe-winning limited series Unbelievable and Netflix's 13 Reasons Why.

Filmography

References

External links 
 

1994 births
Place of birth missing (living people)
Living people